The Rolling Downs Group is a stratigraphic group present in the Eromanga and Surat Basins in eastern Australia, which was deposited between the mid Barremian to early Turonian of the Cretaceous period. It primarily consists of nearshore shallow marine sediments deposited in the Eromanga Inland Sea, though the uppermost and terminal members, the Winton Formation and the Griman Creek Formation represents freshwater deposits. It is notable for its fossil content including many dinosaurs and mammals, as well as opal. A relict species of dicynodont was suggested to have been found in these rocks, but is more likely to be misidentified pieces of a Cenozoic marsupial from younger sediments.

References 

Geologic groups of Oceania
Geologic formations of Australia
Cretaceous System of Australia
Early Cretaceous Australia
Albian Stage
Aptian Stage
Barremian Stage
Cenomanian Stage
Turonian Stage
Fossiliferous stratigraphic units of Oceania
Paleontology in Australia
Geology of New South Wales
Geology of Queensland
Geology of South Australia